Pusti Javor is a small settlement in the Municipality of Ivančna Gorica in central Slovenia. It lies in the hills northeast of Šentvid pri Stični, close to the source of the Temenica River. The area is part of the historical region of Lower Carniola. The municipality is now included in the Central Slovenia Statistical Region.

References

External links
Pusti Javor on Geopedia

Populated places in the Municipality of Ivančna Gorica